Richard Kim may refer to:

 Richard E. Kim (1932–2009), Korean-American writer and professor of literature
 Richard Kim (karate) (1917–2001), martial arts expert and teacher
 Richard Kim (car designer), Canadian car designer (2004-present)
 Richard Kim, executive editor of The Nation
 Richard C. Kim, U.S. Army general